May Henrietta Mukle FRAM (14 May 1880 – 20 February 1963) was a British cellist and composer. She has been described as a "noted feminist cellist", who encouraged other women cellists.

Early life 
Mukle was born in London, the daughter of Leopold Mukle. Her father was an immigrant from Hungary, trained as a clockmaker, but best known as an organ builder in London, part of the partnership Imhof & Mukle. Her sisters Anne and Lillian were also musicians.

Career 
Mukle was a working musician for over fifty years, including concert tours in Australia, Africa, and Asia. Her instrument was built by Montagnana and bought for her by an anonymous donor. Mukle was also a composer of works for cello and piano.

She performed as a soloist, and in chamber ensembles. She was a member of the all-women English Ensemble, with violinist Marjorie Hayward, violist Rebecca Clarke, and pianist Kathleen Long. In 1925, Mukle played at New York's Aeolian Hall with Percy Grainger and Lionel Tertis. With her pianist sister, Anne Mukle, she was a member of the Maud Powell Trio. Also with Anne, she gave the first performance of Ralph Vaughan Williams' Six Studies in English Folk Song in London in 1926.

Mukle's apartment near Wigmore Hall was convenient for hosting visiting musicians; she also convinced the landlords to rent other apartments to musicians, so there would be fewer conflicts about noise. She founded the Mainly Musicians Club in a basement in London; during World War II, she converted it into a air raid shelter. She was an original member of the Society of Women Musicians, present at the organization's first meeting in 1911.

Mukle was described in The Times as "in the very front rank of living violoncellists", and her obituary in The Times says of her: "by the turn of the century she was fully recognized not only as an outstanding musician but as one of the most remarkable cellists this country had produced."

Personal life and legacy 
Mukle broke her wrist in a car accident in 1959, at age 79, but resumed playing after it healed, performing in North Carolina in 1960. She died at Cuckfield, Sussex, in 1963, at the age of 82. Her portrait, painted by John Mansfield Crealock, is held in the museum of the Royal Academy of Music. The May Mukle Prize was founded in 1964 in her honour and is awarded each year to a cello student of the college.

References

External links
 Portrait of May Mukle

Autographed postcard print of May Henrietta Mukle, before World War I, in the National Portrait Gallery.
Recordings of May Mukle included in the National Jukebox, Library of Congress.

1880 births
1963 deaths
Women cellists
Fellows of the Royal Academy of Music
Musicians from London
British cellists
20th-century British musicians
20th-century classical musicians
20th-century English women musicians
20th-century cellists